Kathrin Lardi (born 28 December 1942) is a Swiss athlete. She competed in the women's pentathlon at the 1972 Summer Olympics.

References

1942 births
Living people
Athletes (track and field) at the 1972 Summer Olympics
Swiss pentathletes
Olympic athletes of Switzerland
Place of birth missing (living people)